Karim Bennoui (born 26 January 1988), also known as "Le Chirurgien", is a French-Algerian Muay Thai kickboxer. He is a three-time WKN super featherweight (oriental rules) champion. He is also a former It's Showtime -61 kg champion and ISKA -62.3 kg champion.

Biography and career

Biography 
Karim Bennoui was born on 26 January 1988. Bennoui resides in Lyon, France and trains at Gym boxing St Fons in Lyon, Saint-Fons. His trainer is Nasser Kacem. He is of Algerian descent.

He begins Muaythai at the age of 10, with Nasser Kacem who was educator in the suburbs of Lyon. His younger brother, Houcine Bennoui, also practices in professional muaythai.

Early career 
It counts 38 fights for 30 wins (including 13 by knockout), 6 defeats and 2 draws. Karim Bennoui fought in Muaythai and Kickboxing.

In 2009 he became French Muay Thai Champion FMDA Class A and in 2011 at only 23 years he won the It's Showtime 61MAX world title -61 kg.

He was scheduled to face Plynoi Por Paoin at Thai Fight: Lyon on 19 September 2012 in Lyon, France. The fight was cancelled, however, when Plynoi suffered a knockout loss against Hiroki Ishii in Japan four days before.

He rematched Thomas Adamandopoulos at Nuit des Champions in Marseilles on 24 November 2012 in a fight for the WKN World Oriental Rules title (-62.100 kg) and won by decision.

Bennoui was then expected to fight Koya Urabe at Krush.25 in Tokyo, Japan on 14 December 2012. However, he was forced to pull out of the bout due to an injury to his right hand sustained in the Adamandopoulos fight and was replaced by Mickael Peynaud.

He lost to Masahiro Yamamoto via an extension round unanimous decision at RISE 92 on 17 March 2013 in Tokyo.

He was set to fight Aranchai Kiatpatarapan at the WBC World Muay Thai Millennium Championship in Saint-Pierre, Réunion on 7 September 2013 but the event fell through.

He won La 20ème Nuit des Champions -62 kg/136 lb tournament in Marseille, France on 23 November 2013, beating both Raz Sarkisjan and Yetkin Özkul on points.

Titles and achievements
 2022 WKN super featherweight oriental rules champion
 2019 Arena Fight Featherweight Kickboxing Champion (-63.000 kg)
 2017 WKN super featherweight oriental rules champion
 2013 NDC K-1 Rules -62 kg Tournament Champion
 2012 WKN super featherweight oriental rules champion
 2011 I.S.K.A. World Kickboxing Champion (-62.300 kg)
 2011 It's Showtime World Champion -61 kg (0 title defences)
 2009 French Muaythai Champion FMDA Class A Champion -60 kg

Kickboxing record

|- style="background:#;"
| 2023-04-29 || ||align=left| Carlos Campos || Fight Night One || Chalon-sur-Saône, France ||  ||  ||
|-  bgcolor="#CCFFCC"
| 2022-05-14 ||Win ||align=left| Dante Jose Garcia Aquey || Generation Fighter 3 || Valentigney, France || TKO (punches) || 5 || 
|-
! style=background:white colspan=9 |
|-  bgcolor="#cfc"
| 2021-10-23 ||Win ||align=left| Neguse Kebrome|| Generation Fighter 2 || Valentigney, France || Decision || 3 ||3:00 
|-  bgcolor="#CCFFCC"
| 2021-09-30 || Win  ||align=left| Angel Chavdarov || MFC 8 || Roussillon, France || Decision  || 3 || 3:00
|-  bgcolor="#CCFFCC"
| 2019-06-08 || Win  ||align=left| Tristan Benard || Arena Fight || France || Decision (Split) || 5 || 3:00
|-
! style=background:white colspan=9 |
|- bgcolor="#FFBBBB"
| 2019-03-30|| Loss ||align=left| Meng Guodong  || Wu Lin Feng 2019: WLF x Lumpinee - China vs Thailand || Zhengzhou, China  || Decision  || 3 || 3:00
|- bgcolor="#FFBBBB"
| 2018-12-01|| Loss ||align=left| Christian Faustino  || Yokkao Next Generation || Italy  || Decision  || 3 || 3:00
|-  bgcolor="#CCFFCC"
| 2018-10-27 || Win  ||align=left| Lukas Mandinec || Fight Legend Geneva || Geneva, Switzerland || Decision (Majority) || 3 || 3:00
|-  bgcolor="#CCFFCC"
| 2018-05-03|| Win||align=left| Cristian Spetcu || MFC 7|| France || Decision   || 3 || 3:00
|-
|- bgcolor="#FFBBBB"
| 2017-11-25|| Loss ||align=left| Eddy Nait Slimani  || Nuit Des Champions 2017 || Marseille, France  || Decision  || 3 || 3:00
|-  bgcolor="#CCFFCC"
| 2017-05-03 || Win ||align=left| Sasa Jovanovic|| Dubai Fight || Dubai || Decision || 5 || 3:00
|-
! style=background:white colspan=9 |
|-  bgcolor="#CCFFCC"
| 2017-03-09 || Win ||align=left| Phetpeekart || MFC 6 || France || Decision || 5 || 3:00
|-
|-
|- bgcolor="#FFBBBB"
| 2016-09-19 || Loss ||align=left| Koya Urabe  || K-1 World GP 2016 -60kg World Tournament, Quarter Finals || Tokyo, Japan || Decision (Unanimous) || 3 || 3:00
|-
|-  bgcolor="#CCFFCC"
| 2016-03-05 || Win ||align=left| Daniel Puertas Gallardo|| MFC 4|| France || Decision || 5 || 3:00
|-
|-  bgcolor="#CCFFCC"
| 2015-11-14 || Win ||align=left| Javier Hernández|| La 22ème Nuit Des Champions|| Francia || Decision (unanimous) || 3 || 3:00
|-
|-  bgcolor="#FFBBBB"
| 2015-10-10 || Loss ||align=left| Christopher Shaw || Yokkao 14 & 15 || United Kingdom || Decision ||  || 
|-
|-  bgcolor="#CCFFCC"
| 2015-03-21 || Win ||align=left| Darren O'Connor || Yokkao 12 & 13	|| United Kingdom || Decision (unanimous) || 3 || 3:00
|-
|-  bgcolor="#FFBBBB"
| 2015-01-18 || Loss ||align=left| Hirotaka Urabe || K-1 World GP 2015 -60kg Championship Tournament, Quarter Finals || Tokyo, Japan || TKO (Cut) || 1 || 2:03
|-
|-  bgcolor="#CCFFCC"
| 2014-11-22 || Win ||align=left| Koya Urabe || La 21ème Nuit des Champions  || Marseille, France || Decision (Split) || 5 || 3:00  
|-
|-  bgcolor="#FFBBBB"
| 2015-12-05 || Loss ||align=left| Yodpayak || La Ligue des Galdiateurs || Thailand || Decision || 5 || 3:00
|-
|-  bgcolor="#FFBBBB"
| 2014-05-30 || Loss ||align=left| Antonio Campagna || Final Fight || Le Havre, France || Decision || 3 || 3:00
|-
|-  bgcolor="#CCFFCC"
| 2013-11-23 || Win ||align=left| Yetkin Özkul || La 20ème Nuit des Champions, Final || Marseilles, France || Decision || 3 || 3:00
|-
! style=background:white colspan=9 |
|-
|-  bgcolor="#CCFFCC"
| 2013-11-23 || Win ||align=left| Raz Sarkisjan || La 20ème Nuit des Champions, Semi finals || Marseilles, France || Decision || 3 || 3:00
|-
|-  bgcolor="#FFBBBB"
| 2013-09-21 || Loss ||align=left| Kwankhao Mor.Ratanabandit || La Nuit des Challenges 12 || Saint-Fons, France || Decision || 5 || 3:00
|-
|-  bgcolor="#FFBBBB"
| 2013-03-17 || Loss ||align=left| Masahiro Yamamoto || RISE 92 || Tokyo, Japan || Extension round decision (unanimous) || 4 || 3:00
|-
|-  bgcolor="#CCFFCC"
| 2012-11-24 || Win ||align=left| Thomas Adamandopoulos || Nuit des Champions || Marseille, France || Decision || 5 || 3:00 
|-
! style=background:white colspan=9 |
|-
|-  bgcolor="#c5d2ea"
| 2012-01-21 || Draw ||align=left| Pajonsuk Por. Pramuk || Yokkao Extreme 2012 || Milan, Italy || Decision draw || 5 || 3:00
|-
|-  bgcolor="#CCFFCC"
| 2011-11-12 || Win ||align=left| Thomas Adamandopoulos || La 18ème Nuit des Champions || Marseille, France || Decision (2-1) || 5 || 3:00
|-
! style=background:white colspan=9 |
|-
|-  bgcolor="#FFBBBB"
| 2011-06-18 || Loss ||align=left| Javier Hernandez || Fix Events & Fightclub Group presents: It's Showtime 2011 || Madrid, Spain || Decision (Unanimous) || 5 || 3:00 
|-
! style=background:white colspan=9 |
|-
|-  bgcolor="#CCFFCC"
| 2011-03-26 || Win ||align=left| Sergio Wielzen || BFN Group presents: It's Showtime Brussels || Brussels, Belgium || Decision (Split) || 5 || 3:00
|-
! style=background:white colspan=9 |
|-
|-  bgcolor="#CCFFCC"
| 2010-10-09 || Win ||align=left| Antonio Campagna || K-1 Shardana || Sardinia, Italy || Decision || 3 || 3:00
|-
|-  bgcolor="#FFBBBB"
| 2010-06-19 || Loss ||align=left| Mickael Peynaud || Explosion Fight Night Volume 01 || Brest, France || Decision || 5 || 3:00
|-
! style=background:white colspan=9 |
|-
|-  bgcolor="#CCFFCC"
| 2010-06-05 || Win ||align=left| Xavier Bastard || La Nuit des Challenges 8 || Saint-Fons, France || TKO (Referee Stoppage/Cut) || 3 || 
|-
|-  bgcolor="#CCFFCC"
| 2010-04-03 || Win ||align=left| Vatsana Sedone || Muaythai Gala in Divonne || Divonne-les-Bains, France || Decision || 5 || 3:00
|-
|-  bgcolor="#FFBBBB"
| 2009-11-28 || Loss ||align=left| Laimangkorn Chuwattana || A-1 World Cup Combat Lyon || Lyon, France || Decision || 5 || 3:00
|-
|-  bgcolor="#CCFFCC"
| 2009-06-20 || Win ||align=left| Néhémie Félicité || La Nuit de la Boxe 2009 || Martinique || TKO (Throw in the towel) || 5 || 
|-
! style=background:white colspan=9 |
|-
|-  bgcolor="#FFBBBB"
| 2009-05-16 || Loss ||align=left| Albert Veera Chey || Légendes et Guerriers || Toulouse, France || TKO (Referee Stoppage) || 5 || 
|-
|-  bgcolor="#FFBBBB"
| 2009-04-11 || Loss ||align=left| Mickael Peynaud || Carcharias Team Boxing Gala || Perpignan, France || Decision || 3 || 3:00
|-
|-  bgcolor="#FFBBBB"
| 2008-10-25 || Loss ||align=left| Vatsana Sedone || Le Choc des Best Fighters 1 || Asnières-sur-Seine, France || Decision || 5 || 3:00
|-
|-  bgcolor="#CCFFCC"
| 2008-06-07 || Win ||align=left| Patrick Carta || La Nuit des Challenges 5 || Saint-Fons, France || Decision || 5 || 3:00
|-  bgcolor="#c5d2ea"
| 2008-03-02 || Draw ||align=left| Matteo Luppi || Fighting Day 8 || Imola, Italy || Decision draw || 3 || 3:00
|-
|-
| colspan=9 | Legend:

See also 
List of male kickboxers

External links
Karim Bennoui Interview

References

1988 births
Living people
French male kickboxers
Algerian male kickboxers
French Muay Thai practitioners
French sportspeople of Algerian descent
People from Bourgoin-Jallieu
Sportspeople from Isère